Epiphragmophora clausomphalos is a species of air-breathing land snail, a terrestrial pulmonate gastropod mollusk in the family Epiphragmophoridae. It occurs in Peru.

References

Epiphragmophoridae
Stylommatophora
Gastropods described in 1850